Temescal Valley may refer to:

Geoglogic
  Temescal Valley (California), in western Riverside County, California, a part of the  Elsinore Trough.

Geographic
  Temescal Valley, California a populated place in the Temescal Valley of California.